Shahbazpur is a village in Shahbazpur Union, Sarail Upazila, Brahmanbaria District in the Chittagong Division of eastern Bangladesh.

Geography

Demographics
According to the 2011 Bangladesh census, Shahbazpur had 4,115 households and a population of 21,429.

Transport
The Dhaka–Sylhet segment of national highway N2 crosses the Titas River at Shahbazpur.

References

Populated places in Brahmanbaria District
Villages in Brahmanbaria District
Villages in Chittagong Division